WALE may refer to:

WALE-LD, a low-power television station (channel 16, virtual 17) licensed to serve Montgomery, Alabama, United States
WBHU, a radio station (105.5MHz/Channel 288) licensed to St. Augustine Beach, Florida, United States which previously used the WALE callsign from September 30-December 22, 2014
WALE (Rhode Island), a defunct AM radio station (990kHz) licensed to Providence and later Greenville, Rhode Island, United States that held the WALE callsign from 1989 until its deletion on April 1, 2014
WHTB, an AM radio station (1400kHz) licensed to Fall River, Massachusetts that held the call sign WALE from 1948 until 1989